Mohamad Shaiful bin Esah Nain (born 12 May 1986) is a retired professional football player who played for the S.League and the Singapore national team as a left-back.

Club career
Shaiful has previously played for S.League clubs Young Lions, Singapore Armed Forces and LionsXII. 
Shaiful played in the AFC Champions League during his time with the warriors. He has a cultured left foot and is deadly from set pieces and dead ball situations having scored countless goals from long range and free kicks.
He is the regular taker of the corner kick and free kick for his club and country. He then later went on to sign for Tampines Rovers in 2013 till 2015 and Warriors in 2016.

Shaiful retired from football in 2017 thus ending his 13 years career as a footballer.

International career
He was part of the Singapore Under-23 team that took part in the 2007 Southeast Asian Games in Korat, Thailand that won a bronze medal.

He made his debut for the Singapore against Vietnam in the 2nd leg of the quarter-final round of the Suzuki Cup.

Shaiful has also been a goal threat for oppositions with his accurate free kicks and his delivery from corners which had helped a goal-shy Singapore in their 2012 AFF Suzuki Cup attempt.

Personal life
After retiring from football, Shaiful currently works as safety co-ordinator in Kimly construction, Singapore.

Career statistics

Club

. Caps and goals may not be correct.

 Young Lions and LionsXII are ineligible for qualification to AFC competitions in their respective leagues.

International goals
Scores and results list Singapore's goal tally first.

Honours

Club

Singapore Armed Forces
S.League: 2006, 2007, 2008, 2009
Singapore Cup: 2007, 2008

Tampines Rovers FC
S.League: 2013

International
Singapore
AFF Championship: 2012
Southeast Asian Games: Bronze Medal - 2007, 2009

References

External links
 https://web.archive.org/web/20090324203005/http://data2.7m.cn/Player_data/48152/en/index.shtml

 
 
 
 
 http://www.goal.com/en-sg/match/108466/myanmar-vs-singapore/report

1986 births
Living people
Singaporean footballers
Singapore international footballers
Warriors FC players
Tampines Rovers FC players
Singapore Premier League players
LionsXII players
Singaporean people of Malay descent
Association football fullbacks
Malaysia Super League players
Young Lions FC players
Footballers at the 2006 Asian Games
Southeast Asian Games bronze medalists for Singapore
Southeast Asian Games medalists in football
Competitors at the 2007 Southeast Asian Games
Competitors at the 2009 Southeast Asian Games
Asian Games competitors for Singapore